Larsen Bank  is a shoal with a least depth of  in the northern part of Newcomb Bay, Antarctica, located  north of Kilby Island in the Windmill Islands.

The bank was named by the Antarctic Names Committee of Australia for Ludvig Larsen, second mate on the Thala Dan, used by the Australian National Antarctic Research Expeditions in a 1962 survey of Newcomb Bay.

References

Shoals of Antarctica
Landforms of the Southern Ocean
Landforms of Wilkes Land
Windmill Islands